Nikos Floros is a Greek sculptor. He is known for creating sculptural art by using aluminium cans for soft drinks  as raw material. This technique was created and patented by Nikos Floros in New York in 2003.

Nikos Floros’ artwork was chosen by the Brazilian educational system to be included in school textbooks.

Biography 
He was born in and comes from Tripoli, Arcadia. He grew up in Athens, where he studied classical piano and ancient drama. He continued his studies at the National School of Fine Arts in Paris, France — École des Beaux-Arts.

Exhibitions 
Solo exhibitions:

 Foundation of the Hellenic World, Athens, Greece, 2008
 Archaeological Museum of Thessaloniki, Greece, 2011
 Grace: Symbol of Change, Monte Carlo, 2012
 Metropole Palace, Monte Carlo, 2012
 National Museum of Women in the Arts, Washington, D.C., USA, 2012
 Melas Mansion, National Bank of Greece, Athens, Greece, 2013
 Teatro Comunale di Bologna, Bologna, Italy, 2013
 Tsaritsyno Museum-Reserve, Moscow, Russia, 2013 
 Grand Hotel Majestic "già Baglioni", Bologna, Italy, 2013
 The Knights' Grand Master Palace, Rhodes Island, Greece, 2015
 Heroes Made of Metal, Collection “Victoria G. Karelia”, Kalamata, Greece, 2021 
 Syntagma Square of the Attiko Metro, Athens, Greece
 Gallery Art Cargo, Hellenic-German Exhibition, Athens, Greece
 Greek Consulate in New York; The Hofburg Imperial Palace, Vienna, Austria

Group Exhibitions:

 Whitney Museum of American Art
 Metropolitan Club
 French Heritage Society
 Benaki Museum, Athens, Greece
 The Hofburg Imperial Palace, Vienna, Austria
 Historical and Folklore Museum of Aegina, Greece
 Piraeus Bank, Athens, Greece
 Pierides Museum “Athinais”, Athens, Greece
 Art Meets Media, Athens, Greece
 The Hofburg Imperial Palace, Vienna, Austria
 Consulate General of the Republic of Cyprus, New York, NY, USA

Awards 

 Grand Prize, for the “Red Queen Elizabeth” artwork-costume, given by the Metropolitan Museum of Art Costume Institute
 Grand Prize, for the “Silver Elizabeth I” artwork-costume, from the “Young Friends Heritage Society”
 Golden medal of Arts and Sciences, Albert Schweitzer Foundation, 2011
 Global Thinkers Forum Excellence Award for Excellence and Innovation, 2013

References 

Greek sculptors
Living people
Year of birth missing (living people)
21st-century Greek sculptors
Artists from Athens